John de Borman (born 1954 in Paris) is a French born British cinematographer.

Selected filmography

References

External links
 

1954 births
Living people
British cinematographers
Borman, John de